Frederick or Fred Edwards may refer to:
 Fred Edwards (footballer) (1891–1972), Australian rules footballer
 Frederick Edwards (cricketer) (1908–1982), Australian cricketer
 Frederick Erasmus Edwards (1799–1875), British law clerk and amateur geologist
 Frederick Jeremiah Edwards (1894–1964), Irish recipient of the Victoria Cross
 Frederick Wallace Edwards (1888–1940), British entomologist